EQA may refer to:
 Ecuador, ITU country code
Equivalent average (EqA), a baseball metric
European Quality Award
External quality assessment
Mercedes-Benz EQA, an electric sport utility vehicle